"Cambalache" is a 1934 tango by Enrique Santos Discépolo.

Cambalache may also refer to:

 Cambalache, Arecibo, Puerto Rico, a neighborhood
 Cambalache (band), a musical group from Los Angeles, California